Mariana Sîrbu (born in Iaşi, Romania) is a Romanian violinist.

Biography 
Sîrbu started playing the violin under the supervision of her parents. She then studied with Ştefan Gheorghiu at the  "Ciprian Porumbescu" National University of Music Bucharest in Bucharest.
She became internationally recognized when she began her concert career.
She performed as soloist in many of the world’s great concert halls such as Berliner Philharmonie,  Teatro Colón (Buenos Aires),  Sydney Opera House,  Wiener Musikverein, Concertgebouw (Amsterdam),  Carnegie Hall and Lincoln Center (New York), Teatro alla Scala (Milan) and Suntory Hall (Tokyo). She also took part in many international music festivals.

In 1968, Sîrbu was a founder of the Academica String Quartet, with which she toured in many countries. With the quartet, she was a prize-winner at several international competitions including Liège 1972, Munich 1973, Geneva 1974 and Belgrade 1975.

In 1985, Sîrbu joined the Trio di Milano with pianist Bruno Canino and cellist Rocco Filippini. In 1994 she participated in establishing the Quartetto Stradivari. From 1992 bis 2003 she was concertmaster of the I Musici chamber orchestra. She was recently appointed principal guest director of the Irish Chamber Orchestra.

Sîrbu plays a Stradivarius [violin (model “Conte di Fontana”, 1702),  which had been played by Russian violinist David Oistrakh.

Teaching activities 

After graduating from university, Sîrbu worked for several years as assistant  of Ştefan Gheorghiu in Bucharest.  She later taught at the Scuola di Musica di Fiesole in Florence. She has given master classes in Spain, Ireland, Italy, France, Switzerland, The Netherlands, Canada, Japan and China. Since 2002 Mariana Sîrbu is professor of violin an at the Felix Mendelssohn College of Music and Theatre in Leipzig. Mariana Sîrbu is visiting professor at the Irish World Academy of Music and Dance, University of Limerick, Ireland.

Sîrbu was member of several international juries for competitions such the Concorso Internazionale Triennale di Liuteria (Cremona), the  Concorso Vittorio Gui (Florence), the chamber music competition Concorso Lorenzi (Trieste), the string quartet competitions  in Évian-les-Bains and Bordeaux and the violin competition George Enescu (Bucharest).

Recordings 

Many of Mariana Sîrbu’s performances have been recorded, among which Beethoven’s violin sonatas and his Triple Concerto,  Enescu’s violin sonatas,  the twelve concertos for solo violin  of Locatelli’s  L’arte del Violino, Vivaldi’s twelve violin concertos.

Discography 
 1995 Enescu: Violin Sonatas 
 2012 Franck: Chamber Works

Awards 
 George Enescu Prize (Bucharest)
 Carl Flesch Prize (London)
 Maria Canals Prize (Barcelona)
 Vittorio Gui Preis (Florence)

References

External links 
 Mariana Sirbu at allmusic.com

Romanian classical violinists
Musicians from Iași
National University of Music Bucharest alumni
Year of birth missing (living people)
Living people
Women classical violinists
21st-century classical violinists
21st-century women musicians